Amy Gordon-Lennox, Countess of March (24 June 1847 – 23 August 1879), formerly Amy Mary Ricardo, was the first wife of Charles Gordon-Lennox, 7th Duke of Richmond, and the mother of Charles Gordon-Lennox, 8th Duke of Richmond. She died before her husband inherited the dukedom.

Amy was the daughter of Percy Ricardo (1820–1892) of Bramley Park, Guildford, Surrey, and his wife, the former Matilda Mawdesley Hensley (1826–1880), herself the daughter of John Isaac Hensley of Holborn in Middlesex. Amy was the sister of Colonel Horace Ricardo and of Colonel F. C. Ricardo of Cookham in Berkshire. 

Amy married the future duke, then Earl of March, on 10 November 1868. Their children were:

Charles Gordon-Lennox, 8th Duke of Richmond (1870-1935), who married Hilda Brassey and had children
Lady Evelyn Amy Gordon-Lennox (1872-1922), who married Sir John Richard Geers Cotterell, 4th Baronet, and had children
Lady Violet Mary Gordon-Lennox (1874-1946), who married Major Henry Brassey, 1st Baron Brassey of Apethorpe, and had children
Brigadier-General Lord Esmé Gordon-Lennox (1875-1949), who married, first, the Hon. Hermione Frances Caroline Fellowes, and second, Rosamond Lorys Palmer, and had children from both marriages
Major Lord Bernard Gordon-Lennox (1878-1914), who married Evelyn Loch and had children; he was killed in action during the First World War. 

In 1877, the countess compiled and published a catalogue of the art works held at the family homes, Goodwood House and Gordon Castle.

After Amy's death in August 1879, a year after the birth of her youngest son, aged 32, the future duke married Isabel Sophie Craven in 1882, and had further children. Isabel died in November 1887, and the duke thereafter remained a widower until his death in 1928.

References

1847 births
1879 deaths
British courtesy countesses